Decatur is a city, in Benton County, Arkansas, United States. The population was 1,699 at the 2010 census. It is part of the Northwest Arkansas region. This town is named after Commodore Stephen Decatur, Jr.

Geography
Decatur is located in western Benton County at  (36.337541, -94.456721). Arkansas Highway 102 leads east  to Bentonville and west  to the Oklahoma border.

Demographics

2020 census

As of the 2020 United States census, there were 1,773 people, 591 households, and 419 families residing in the city.

2010 census
As of the 2010 census Decatur had a population of 1,699.  The racial and ethnic makeup of the population was 62.4% non-Hispanic white, 0.5% non-Hispanic black, 4.3% Native American, 0.9% Asian, 5.2% from two or more races and 28.4% Hispanic or Latino.

2000 census
As of the census of 2000, there were 1,314 people, 465 households, and 346 families residing in the city. The racial makeup of the city was 80.97% White, 5.48% Native American, 0.46% Asian, 10.12% from other races, and 2.97% from two or more races.  16.51% of the population were Hispanic or Latino of any race.

There were 465 households, out of which 44.7% had children under the age of 18 living with them, 52.3% were married couples living together, 15.7% had a female householder with no husband present, and 25.4% were non-families. 21.9% of all households were made up of individuals, and 9.5% had someone living alone who was 65 years of age or older.  The average household size was 2.83 and the average family size was 3.23.

In the city, the population was spread out, with 32.0% under the age of 18, 9.8% from 18 to 24, 33.3% from 25 to 44, 16.1% from 45 to 64, and 8.8% who were 65 years of age or older.  The median age was 29 years. For every 100 females, there were 111.6 males.  For every 100 females age 18 and over, there were 103.0 males.

The median income for a household in the city was $29,844, and the median income for a family was $33,333. Males had a median income of $22,115 versus $19,125 for females. The per capita income for the city was $11,618.  About 16.3% of families and 18.3% of the population were below the poverty line, including 23.2% of those under age 18 and 22.1% of those age 65 or over.

Education 
Public education for elementary and secondary school students is provided by the Decatur School District, leading to graduation from Decatur High School.

References

External links
Decatur Arkansas Chamber of Commerce

 
Cities in Benton County, Arkansas
Cities in Arkansas
Northwest Arkansas